Baikonur, formerly known as Leninsk, is a city of republic significance in Kazakhstan on the northern bank of the Syr Darya river. It is currently leased and administered by the Russian Federation as an enclave until 2050. It was constructed to service the Baikonur Cosmodrome and was officially renamed Baikonur by Russian president Boris Yeltsin on December 20, 1995. During the Soviet period, it was sometimes referred to as Zvezdograd, Russian for Star City.

Foreign visitors need pre-approval from the Russian authorities to visit both the town of Baikonur itself and the Cosmodrome. Foreign visitors need to obtain a written approval which is completely separate from having a regular Russian visa.

History

The original Baikonur (Kazakh for "wealthy brown", i.e. "fertile land with many herbs") is a mining town 320 kilometres northeast of the present location, near Dzhezkazgan in Kazakhstan's Karagandy Region. Starting with Vostok 1 in April 1961, the launch site was given this name to cause confusion and keep the location secret. (The original Baikonur's residents took advantage of the confusion by ordering and receiving many scarce materials before government officials discovered the deception.) Baikonur's railway station predates the base and retains the old name of Tyuratam. This was the original Soviet railway station (railhead) on the Moscow to Tashkent Railway that the Cosmodrome was initially named after.

The fortunes of the city have varied according to those of the Soviet or Russian space program and its Baikonur Cosmodrome. 

Due to the city's military and scientific significance, it was closed off by Soviet authorities. It did not appear on maps available to the general public during the Soviet period prior to perestroika.

The Soviet government established the Nauchno-Issledovatel'skii Ispytatel'nyi Poligon N.5 (NIIIP-5), or Scientific-Research Test Range N.5 by its decree of 12 February 1955. The U-2 high-altitude reconnaissance plane found and photographed the Tyuratam missile test range (cosmodrome Baikonur) for the first time on 5 August 1957.

The town has unique ties with space, and hence the history of the rocket building and space binds all the sights in the area and the cosmodrome. However, there are only a few exceptions: old locomotive, an Orthodox Church and a new mosque.

The city administratively belongs to the Odintsovsky District of Moscow Oblast.

Climate
Baikonur features a cold desert climate (BWk).

Places of interest
South of city center, near the Syr Darya River there is a large park with several sports and amusement facilities. Among these is a ferris wheel, which is no longer in use. The park is located at coordinates .

Gallery

See also
 List of closed cities

References

Further reading
 "Testing of rocket and space technology - the business of my life" Events and facts - A.I. Ostashev, Korolyov, 2001.;
 "Baikonur. Korolev. Yangel." - M. I. Kuznetsk, Voronezh: IPF "Voronezh", 1997, ;
 «At risk» – A. A. Toul, Kaluga, "the Golden path", 2001. 
 "Unknown Baikonur" - edited by B. I. Posysaeva, M.: "globe", 2001. 
 "Rocket and space feat Baikonur" - Vladimir Порошков, the "Patriot" publishers 2007. 
 A.I. Ostashev, Sergey Pavlovich Korolyov - The Genius of the 20th Century — 2010 M. of Public Educational Institution of Higher Professional Training MGUL .
 "Bank of the Universe" - edited by Boltenko A. C., Kyiv, 2014., publishing house "Phoenix", 
 "We grew hearts in Baikonur" - Author: Eliseev V. I. M: publisher OAO MPK in 2018,

External links

 RussianSpaceWeb.com on Baikonur town
 Baikonur cosmodrome placemark 
 Launch of the manned spacecraft Soyuz from the Baikonur Cosmodrome
 

 
Cities and towns in Kazakhstan
Populated places established in 1955
Populated places in Kyzylorda Region
Closed cities
Regions of Kazakhstan
1955 establishments in the Soviet Union